Kevin Paul Hollinrake (born 28 September 1963) is a British Conservative politician and businessman. He has been the Member of Parliament (MP) for Thirsk and Malton since May 2015 and has been serving as Parliamentary Under Secretary of State for Enterprise and Markets since October 2022.

Early life and education
Kevin Hollinrake was born and brought up in North Yorkshire. He attended Easingwold School and studied physics at Sheffield Polytechnic. He later owned Crayke Castle.

Business 
After dropping out of Polytechnic, Kevin Hollinrake started working for Prudential. Then he co-founded Hunters estate agency in York in 1992. The agency had grown to over 150 branches across the country by 2015, with Hollinrake holding a 15% stake in the company. Hunters Property was admitted to trading on AIM in July 2015 with a market capitalisation of £16.9m. In February 2015, the company issued an IPO (initial public offering) for new investors to raise £2.5 m for capital investment.

In 2009, Hollinrake became a director of Vizzihome from which he resigned as a director in 2013. In 2013 he founded Shoptility Limited where he was the Chairman until commencement of voluntary winding up in October 2017, and the company was dissolved in June 2019.

In July 2007, Hollinrake was selected as the Conservative candidate for Dewsbury for the 2010 general election, however he resigned his candidacy in October 2008 to focus on his business.

MP since general election, 2015 
Hollinrake was selected to be the Conservative candidate for the seat of Thirsk and Malton in the county of North Yorkshire, following the de-selection of Anne McIntosh. Hollinrake is a strong supporter of David Cameron's Northern Powerhouse idea, which aims to link the north of England more closely to markets in the south; making it easier to travel, exchange and do business.

In January 2016, Hollinrake was one of 72 MPs who voted down an amendment in Parliament on rental homes being "fit for human habitation" who were themselves landlords who derived an income from a property.

He served as the Parliamentary Private Secretary to Michael Gove as Secretary of State for Environment, Food and Rural Affairs.

Hollinrake was opposed to Brexit prior to the 2016 referendum. He voted in favour of adhering to the result of the EU referendum and states that he now supports Brexit.

In 2019, Hollinrake was one of 72 MPs who voted to not permit same-sex marriages in Northern Ireland.

In 2020, Hollinrake became one of four Vice-Chairs of the All Party Parliamentary Group on Whistleblowing. This group has been subject to criticism by some campaigners on whistleblowing law reform.

In September 2020, Hollinrake was criticised for a tweet he made in response to a question about the free school meal campaign ran by footballer Marcus Rashford. When asked on Twitter ''why it takes a footballer to make a stand for hungry children in our country'', he replied that ''where they can, it's a parent's job to feed their children.'' This prompted a backlash from Rashford and members of the public. Hollinrake defended himself, stating that tax rises would be required for such action, and offered to debate Rashford on the matter.

In April 2021, The Observer revealed that Hollinrake claimed expenses of £2,925 each month between April and November 2020 to pay his own rent despite renting out five residential properties of his own in York. When asked to comment, Hollinrake acknowledged that he owned other properties, but claimed to have seen a "substantial reduction in earnings" since leaving the private sector and said that he did not think it would be reasonable for him to have to pay for his own accommodation expenses in London.

In November 2021, he was one of 13 Conservative MPs who voted against a government-supported amendment to defer the suspension of Conservative MP Owen Paterson who was found to have breached lobbying rules.

Fracking
On 2 February 2018, Hollinrake authored an article in The Yorkshire Post titled: "Why I'm supporting fracking in Yorkshire", in which he argued fracking was too good an opportunity to miss and would help tackle climate change. Critics have argued that shale gas is a fossil fuel and extracting it will make climate change worse, but Hollinrake has argued it provides part of the transition to a low carbon energy mix. In May 2015, Hollinrake said that he would be writing to Amber Rudd, the Secretary of State for Energy, to declare support for "safe and discreet" fracking, as long as sufficient compensation was received locally.

In January 2016, Hollinrake stood down as Vice Chair of the All Party Parliamentary Group on Unconventional Oil and Gas after he received complaints from his constituents about funding received from fracking companies. In his resignation statement he said: "A number of constituents have contacted me to express concerns that my involvement with the [group] is inappropriate, due to the amount of sponsorship it receives from the oil and gas industry."

Personal life
Hollinrake is married to Nikky and has four children.

Notes

References

External links

Official website

1963 births
Conservative Party (UK) MPs for English constituencies
Living people
Alumni of Sheffield Hallam University
UK MPs 2015–2017
UK MPs 2017–2019
UK MPs 2019–present